Khamlung is a village development committee in the Himalayas of Taplejung District in the Province No. 1 of north-eastern Nepal. At the time of the 2011 Nepal census it had a population of 1517 people living in 319 individual households. There were 730 males and 787 females at the time of census.

The major famous place of Khamlung VDC are Sagfhara, Dovan, Tamor river, Maiwaa khola.

References

External links
UN map of the municipalities of Taplejung District

Populated places in Taplejung District